The 1330s in music involved some events.

Events 
1330
Juan Ruiz, the Arcipreste de Hita, writes the first version of his El libro de buen amor, which describes many musical practices in Spain.
1334
1337
exact date unknown – Pedro IV of Aragon summons to his court the musicians Ali Eziqua and Çahat Mascum, his favourite players of the rebec and exabeba.
1338
28 January (by modern reckoning; 1337 by ecclesiastical usage of the time) – Guillaume de Machaut takes up a canonicate in Reims, "per procuratiorem" (i.e., by proxy).

Bands formed 
1334 – Pope Benedict XII institutes the Papal Cappella, which would eventually become the Capella Sistina.

Compositions

Births

Deaths

References

 
14th century in music